Taylor v Plumer [1815] EWHC KB J84 is an English trusts law case, concerning tracing of assets which were wrongfully taken in breach of trust.

Facts
Sir Thomas Plumer gave his broker, Mr Walsh, a draft on his bankers for £22,200 to invest in exchequer bills. Mr Walsh cashed the draft, and got bank notes. He bought £6500 in exchequer bills, and with the balance he got American securities, paying with the bank notes. But he gave one note to his brother in law, in return for his bankers' draft of £500. He then bought 71½ doubloons, with the intention of escaping to North America via Lisbon. Sir Thomas' attorney caught him at Falmouth, and secured a return of the American securities and bullion. Mr Walsh was indicted, tried, found guilty, but pardoned, and then declared bankrupt. His assignees in bankruptcy brought an action in trover against Sir Thomas.

Judgment
Lord Ellenborough held that Sir Thomas had never ceased to be the lawful proprietor.

Although decided in a common law court, Millett LJ in Jones v Jones noted that it was in fact decided under equitable principles. But Millett LJ further noted that substitution has been acknowledged under common law anywhow, for example in Bankque Belge v Hambrouck.

See also

English trusts law

References

English trusts case law
1815 in case law
Court of Chancery cases
1815 in British law